A catbird is any one of several unrelated songbirds with cat-like calls. It may also refer to:

Aircraft
Lockheed Martin CATBird, Lockheed Martin test aircraft
Scaled Composites Catbird, a high-efficiency five-seat single-engine aircraft

Basketball
Louisville Catbirds, a basketball team
La Crosse Catbirds, a basketball team

Other
Catbird, an Australian thoroughbred horse that won the Golden Slipper Stakes in 1999
Catbird, Catwoman's alternate identity in the DC Gothtopia story arc, written by John Layman.
Catbird Networks, a US computer security software company
Catbird Records, a US independent record label
Catbird seat, an idiomatic phrase used to describe an enviable position